Gormshuil Mhòr na Maighe (also called Gormla of Moy; fl. 17th century) was a powerful Gaelic witch from the Lochaber Highlands of Scotland. She is often referred to as the Great Gormula.

Associated with many stories, she is best known for her interactions with Ewen Cameron of Lochiel, Chief of the Clan Cameron who was dubbed the Odysseus of the Highlands, and for the mysterious sinking of a Spanish galleon off the Isle of Mull which she is held responsible for.

Legendary background
Born a MacKinnon, originally from the Isle of Skye, she had been married to a Cameron of Moy in Lochaber but was later widowed. Gormshuil, which means 'the blue-eyed noble one' in Gaelic, was known for her supernatural powers and striking beauty. Fishermen and hunters in Lochaber would often seek her blessing. There are many stories about Gormshuil, also called Gormla, a Gaelic name that was often used to describe witches.

The most quoted story about Gormshuil tells of the warning she gave to her Clan Chief, Sir Ewen Cameron of Lochiel who was passing by on his way to confront the Duke of Atholl about a border dispute between Lochaber and Perthshire. At first, he ignored Gormshuil but she told him to return home to get his men. He should take them with him and keep them hidden and if he needed them he was to turn his coat inside out. Lochiel took her advice and although Atholl too had men lying in wait, he was able to defeat them. The interaction between Lochiel and Atholl went as follows: “We shall set the border here,” said Lochiel. The Duke of Atholl said: “Back, back, back a good piece yet,” said he. Lochiel said he would not go back. Atholl said to him: “Back – I implore you go back.” “I will not go back,” said Lochiel. Lord Atholl, outraged, lifted his hand and men came along a slope. Lochiel asked: “What is that?” The Duke replied: “The Atholl wethers coming to graze the Lochaber grass.” At this Lochiel took his coat off and turned it, and his warriors came charging from along the slope. The Duke asked: “What is that!” Lochiel replied: “The hounds of Lochaber coming to eat the flesh of the Atholl wethers.”

This dispute between Lochiel and Atholl led to the Cameron clan's motto 'Sons of the hounds, come hither and get flesh!' It is also said that this came from the tune Lochiel's piper was playing at the time, 'Thigibh an seo, chlanna nan con, is gheibh sibh feoil, (Come hither, children of the hounds, and you’ll get flesh). Afterwards, although Cameron thanked Gormshuil on his way home, she replied that 'Despite your words of kindness you will hang my son some day.'

Many years later, Gormshuil's only son was charged with murder. However, on her way to see Sir Ewen at Achnacarry Castle to beg for his life, she reminded Lochiel of his promise and their friendship, but to no avail. Gormshuil committed suicide. She thought she had spotted a salmon in the pool and decided to catch it, falling into the flooded burn. It is said that this salmon was in fact the Devil luring her to death.

See also 

 Witchcraft
 Druid
 Ewen Cameron of Lochiel
 The Odyssey
 Circe

External links 

 Website with more information about Gormshuil
 http://www.boydhouse.com/alice/Cameron/cameron07cameronsofscotland.htm

Further reading 

 MacKillop,James (2004) A Dictionary of Celtic Mythology Oxford University Press. 
 Dorson,Richard M. (1971) Sources for the Traditional History of the Scottish Highlands and Western Islands Indiana University Press https://www.jstor.org/stable/3814103
 Thomson, Derick (1991) Bramble of Hope: Poems by Derick Thomson (Smeur an Dòchais: Dàin le Ruaraidh MacThòmais, Canongate. Includes the poem Gormshuil.

References 

17th-century Scottish people
17th-century Scottish women
Witchcraft in Scotland